Mellat Park, literally the Nation Park, is an urban park in northern Tehran, Iran.

It is one of the city's largest green spaces, situated adjacent to Valiasr Street at the foot of the Alborz mountains to the east, extending to Chamran Expressway and Seoul Street to the west. It is watered by winter-snow streams coming down from Mount Tochal.

The park lies in the southern grounds of Tehran International Fair and the Enghelab Club. It is home to one of the first musical fountains in Tehran, and includes facilities such as playgrounds, snack bars, cafes, and a small aviary. There is also a cineplex at the southeastern edge of the park.

Before the 1979 Revolution, it was known as the Imperial Park. It is also the location of a steam-powered locomotive used on Iran's first railway section, built between 1886 and 1888. The locomotive was built by Belgian group Ateliers de Tubize, commissioned in 1887.

Mellat Gallery and Cineplex
Mellat Gallery and Cineplex is located to the southeast of the park. It was designed by architects Reza Daneshmir and Catherine Spiridonoff in an area of about 6,000 square meters, and was first opened during a ceremony on November 9, 2008.

The complex includes four theater halls, a cinematheque, and a space for holding exhibitions and marketing cultural products.

Gallery

References

Parks in Tehran